Kenneth A. Templeton (born c. 1951) is a Canadian curler.

At the national level, he won the 1976 Macdonald Brier, as a member of the first ever team from Newfoundland and Labrador to win the Brier.

Personal life
As of 1992, Templeton was employed as a lawyer in St. John's.

Teams

References

External links
 
 Kenneth Templeton – Curling Canada Stats Archive
 
 1976 Brier - CurlingRichardsons
 

Living people
Canadian male curlers
Brier champions
1950s births
Place of birth missing (living people)
Curlers from Newfoundland and Labrador
Lawyers in Newfoundland and Labrador
Sportspeople from St. John's, Newfoundland and Labrador